Silicon Spin was a half-hour business-related technology television program that aired on ZDTV (later known as TechTV) for several years during the dot-com era from 1998 to 2001. It featured guest panelists (often referred to as pundits), usually business insiders, engaged in debates moderated by host John C. Dvorak.

A number of guest pundits made regular appearances, including Rebecca Eisenberg, Rebecca Roberts (formerly technology correspondent for The World), Kevin Surace, Adam Lashinsky, Janet Rae-Dupree and Jason Pontin from Red Herring magazine. The show was produced by Jennifer Lavin.

External links

TechTV original programming